C. pygmaea may refer to:
 Caragana pygmaea, a species of flowering plant
 Cattleya pygmaea, the small orange sophronitis, a species of orchid in the genus Cattleya found in Brazil and Espírito Santo
 Cebuella pygmaea, the pygmy marmoset or dwarf monkey, a New World monkey species native to the rainforest canopies of western Brazil, southeastern Colombia, eastern Ecuador, eastern Peru and northern Bolivia
 Coenosia pygmaea, a species of fly in the genus Coenosia
 Compsaditha pygmaea, a species of pseudoscorpion in the genus Compsaditha found in the Philippines
 Crematogaster pygmaea, a species of ant in the genus Crematogaster
 Cupressus pygmaea, an incorrect spelling for Cupressus pigmaea, the Mendocino cypress, a taxon of disputed status endemic to certain coastal terraces and coastal mountain ranges of Mendocino and Sonoma Counties in northwestern California